Juha Annunen (born 16 April 1960) is a retired Finnish football midfielder. At club level he played for FC Kuusysi and Oulun Työväen Palloilijat.

References

1964 births
Living people
Finnish footballers
FC Kuusysi players
Association football midfielders
Finland under-21 international footballers
Finland international footballers
Oulun Työväen Palloilijat players
Sportspeople from Oulu